Persepolis Football Club Academy are the youth team of Persepolis Football Club. They currently play in the AFC Vision Asia Youth Premier League, the highest level of youth football in Iran.

The Academy

Current squad
Players in bold are National Player

U-21

Season: 2015–16 (Players born after 1995)

U-19

Season: 2016–17 (Players born after 1998)

U-16

Season: 2021–22 (Players born after 2004/05)

U-14

Season: 2015–16 (Players born after 2002)

Former players

Significant Academy Products

Goalkeeper
  Alireza Haghighi
  Amir Abedzadeh
  Mehrdad Tahmasbi
  Morteza Ghadimipour
  Mehrdad Hosseini
  Nader Safarzaei
  Abolfazl Darvishvand

Defender
  Morteza Pouraliganji
  Hadi Mohammadi
  Milad Mohammadi
  Navid Khosh Hava
  Mohammad Nosrati
  Hamed Noormohammadi
  Mohammad Sattari
  Morteza Asadi
  Amir Abbas Ayenechi
  Reza Abedian
  Hadi Aghili
  Ahmad Ahi
  Hossein Kanaani
  Saeid Ghadami
  Ali Astani
  Mobin Mirdoraghi
  Shahin Abbasian
  Ehsan Hosseini

Midfielder
  Mohammad Parvin
  Amir Hossein Amiri
  Amir Hossein Feshangchi
  Mohammad Mehdi Elhaei
  Khosro Heydari
  Siamak Nemati
  Siavash Hagh Nazari
  Amir Mohammad Madani
  Ebrahim Asadi
  Hossein Abdi
  Ebrahim Sadeghi
  Milad Nouri 
  Hamed Khosravi
  Milad Kamandani
  Mohammad Rahmati
  Navid Sabouri
  Hadi Mahdavikia
  Hamed Kavianpour
  Rouhollah Seifollahi
  Afshin Esmaeilzadeh
  Farshad Ahmadzadeh
  Reza Shekari
  Farshad Ghasemi
  Jacques Elong Elong
  Amir Hossein Tahuni
  Hamidreza Taherkhani
  Saeid Hosseinpour

Forward
  Hadi Norouzi
  Mehrdad Mohammadi
  Mehrdad Oladi
  Mohsen Bayatinia
  Morteza Aghakhan
  Mehrdad Bayrami
  Sajjad Ashouri
  Shahab Zahedi
  Shahriar Moghanlou
  Ehsan Khorsandi
  Saeed Hallafi
  Faraz Emamali
  Ali Fatemi
  Mohammad Amin Asadi
  Ahmad Baharvand

Other Players promoted to first team 
  Javad Razzaghi
  Ardalan Ashtiani
  Meghdad Ghobakhlou
  Ziaeddin Niknafs
  Amirhossein Ipakchi
  Mehran Farziat
  Mohsen Eliasi
  Masoud Dastani

See also

Reserve teams
 Persepolis Qaem Shahr
 Shamoushak Noshahr

References

External links

Academy
Persepolis